An epileptic seizure, informally known as a seizure, is a period of symptoms due to abnormally excessive or synchronous neuronal activity in the brain. Outward effects vary from uncontrolled shaking movements involving much of the body with loss of consciousness (tonic-clonic seizure), to shaking movements involving only part of the body with variable levels of consciousness (focal seizure), to a subtle momentary loss of awareness (absence seizure). Most of the time these episodes last less than two minutes and it takes some time to return to normal. Loss of bladder control may occur.

Seizures may be provoked and unprovoked. Provoked seizures are due to a temporary event such as low blood sugar, alcohol withdrawal, abusing alcohol together with prescription medication, low blood sodium, fever, brain infection, or concussion. Unprovoked seizures occur without a known or fixable cause such that ongoing seizures are likely. Unprovoked seizures may be exacerbated by stress or sleep deprivation. Epilepsy describes brain disease in which there has been at least one unprovoked seizure and where there is a high risk of additional seizures in the future. Conditions that look like epileptic seizures but are not include: fainting, nonepileptic psychogenic seizure and tremor.

A seizure that lasts for more than a brief period is a medical emergency. Any seizure lasting longer than five minutes should be treated as status epilepticus. A first seizure generally does not require long-term treatment with anti-seizure medications unless a specific problem is found on electroencephalogram (EEG) or brain imaging. Typically it is safe to complete the work-up following a single seizure as an outpatient. In many, with what appears to be a first seizure, other minor seizures have previously occurred.

Up to 10% of people have had at least one epileptic seizure in their lifetime. Provoked seizures occur in about 3.5 per 10,000 people a year while unprovoked seizures occur in about 4.2 per 10,000 people a year. After one seizure, the chance of experiencing a second one is about 50%. Epilepsy affects about 1% of the population at any given time

Signs and symptoms

The signs and symptoms of seizures vary depending on the type. The most common and stereotypical type of seizure is convulsive (60%), typically called a tonic-clonic seizure. Two-thirds of these begin as focal seizures prior to developing into tonic-clonic seizures. The remaining 40% of seizures are non-convulsive, an example of which is absence seizure. When EEG monitoring shows evidence of a seizure, but no symptoms are present, it is referred to as a subclinical seizure.

Focal seizures
Focal seizures often begin with certain experiences, known as an aura. These may include sensory (including visual, auditory, etc.), cognitive, autonomic, olfactory or motor phenomena.

In a complex partial seizure a person may appear confused or dazed and cannot respond to questions or direction.

Jerking activity may start in a specific muscle group and spread to surrounding muscle groups—known as a Jacksonian march. Unusual activities that are not consciously created may occur. These are known as automatisms and include simple activities like smacking of the lips or more complex activities such as attempts to pick something up.

Generalized seizures
There are six main types of generalized seizures: tonic-clonic, tonic, clonic, myoclonic, absence, and atonic seizures. They all involve a loss of consciousness and typically happen without warning.
 Tonic-clonic seizures present with a contraction of the limbs followed by their extension, along with arching of the back for 10–30 seconds. A cry may be heard due to contraction of the chest muscles. The limbs then begin to shake in unison. After the shaking has stopped it may take 10–30 minutes for the person to return to normal.
 Tonic seizures produce constant contractions of the muscles. The person may turn blue if breathing is impaired.
 Clonic seizures involve shaking of the limbs in unison.
 Myoclonic seizures involve spasms of muscles in either a few areas or generalized through the body.
 Absence seizures can be subtle, with only a slight turn of the head or eye blinking. The person often does not fall over and may return to normal right after the seizure ends, though there may also be a period of post-ictal disorientation.
 Atonic seizures involve the loss of muscle activity for greater than one second. This typically occurs bilaterally (on both sides of the body).

Duration
A seizure can last from a few seconds to more than five minutes, at which point it is known as status epilepticus. Most tonic-clonic seizures last less than two or three minutes. Absence seizures are usually around 10 seconds in duration.

Postictal
After the active portion of a seizure, there is typically a period of confusion called the postictal period, before a normal level of consciousness returns. This period usually lasts 3 to 15 minutes, but may last for hours. Other symptoms during this period include: tiredness, headache, difficulty speaking, and abnormal behavior. Psychosis after a seizure occurs in 6–10% of people.

Causes

Seizures have a number of causes. Of those who have a seizure, about 25% have epilepsy. A number of conditions are associated with seizures but are not epilepsy including: most febrile seizures and those that occur around an acute infection, stroke, or toxicity. These seizures are known as "acute symptomatic" or "provoked" seizures and are part of the seizure-related disorders. In many the cause is unknown.

Different causes of seizures are common in certain age groups.
 Seizures in babies are most commonly caused by hypoxic ischemic encephalopathy, central nervous system (CNS) infections, trauma, congenital CNS abnormalities, and metabolic disorders.
 The most frequent cause of seizures in children is febrile seizures, which happen in 2–5% of children between the ages of six months and five years.
 During childhood, well-defined epilepsy syndromes are generally seen.
 In adolescence and young adulthood, non-compliance with the medication regimen and sleep deprivation are potential triggers.
 Pregnancy and labor and childbirth, and the post-partum, or post-natal period (after birth) can be at-risk times, especially if there are certain complications like pre-eclampsia.
 During adulthood, the likely causes are alcohol related, strokes, trauma, CNS infections, and brain tumors.
 In older adults, cerebrovascular disease is a very common cause. Other causes are CNS tumors, head trauma, and other degenerative diseases that are common in the older age group, such as dementia.

Metabolic
Dehydration can trigger epileptic seizures if it is severe enough. A number of disorders including: low blood sugar, low blood sodium, hyperosmolar nonketotic hyperglycemia, high blood sodium, low blood calcium and high blood urea levels may cause seizures. As may hepatic encephalopathy and the genetic disorder porphyria.

Structural
 Cavernoma or cavernous malformation is a treatable medical condition that can cause seizures, headaches, and brain hemorrhages.
 Arteriovenous malformation (AVM) is a treatable medical condition that can cause seizures, headaches, and brain hemorrhages.
 Space-occupying lesions in the brain (abscesses, tumours). In people with brain tumours, the frequency of epilepsy depends on the location of the tumor in the cortical region.

Medications
Both medication and drug overdoses can result in seizures, as may certain medication and drug withdrawal. Common drugs involved include: antidepressants, antipsychotics, cocaine, insulin, and the local anaesthetic lidocaine. Difficulties with withdrawal seizures commonly occurs after prolonged alcohol or sedative use, a condition known as delirium tremens. In people who are at risk of developing epileptic seizures, common herbal medicines such as ephedra, ginkgo biloba and wormwood can provoke seizures.

Infections
 Infection with the pork tapeworm, which can cause neurocysticercosis, is the cause of up to half of epilepsy cases in areas of the world where the parasite is common.
 Parasitic infections such as cerebral malaria. In Nigeria this is one of the most common causes of seizures among children under five years of age.
 Infection, such as encephalitis or meningitis

Stress 
Stress can induce seizures in people with epilepsy, and is a risk factor for developing epilepsy. Severity, duration, and time at which stress occurs during development all contribute to frequency and susceptibility to developing epilepsy. It is one of the most frequently self-reported triggers in patients with epilepsy.

Stress exposure results in hormone release that mediates its effects in the brain. These hormones act on both excitatory and inhibitory neural synapses, resulting in hyper-excitability of neurons in the brain. The hippocampus is known to be a region that is highly sensitive to stress and prone to seizures. This is where mediators of stress interact with their target receptors to produce effects.

Other
Seizures may occur as a result of high blood pressure, known as hypertensive encephalopathy, or in pregnancy as eclampsia when accompanied by either seizures or a decreased level of consciousness. Very high body temperatures may also be a cause.
 Head injury may cause non-epileptic post-traumatic seizures or post-traumatic epilepsy
 About 3.5 to 5.5% of people with celiac disease also have seizures.
 Seizures in a person with a shunt may indicate failure
 Hemorrhagic stroke can occasionally present with seizures, embolic strokes generally do not (though epilepsy is a common later complication); cerebral venous sinus thrombosis, a rare type of stroke, is more likely to be accompanied by seizures than other types of stroke
 Multiple sclerosis may cause seizures
 Electroconvulsive therapy (ECT) deliberately sets out to induce a seizure for the treatment of major depression.
 Reflex seizure induced by a specific stimulus or trigger (extrinsic or intrinsic stimuli)

Mechanism 

Normally, brain electrical activity is non-synchronous. In epileptic seizures, due to problems within the brain, a group of neurons begin firing in an abnormal, excessive, and synchronized manner. This results in a wave of depolarization known as a paroxysmal depolarizing shift.

Normally after an excitatory neuron fires it becomes more resistant to firing for a period of time. This is due in part from the effect of inhibitory neurons, electrical changes within the excitatory neuron, and the negative effects of adenosine. In epilepsy the resistance of excitatory neurons to fire during this period is decreased. This may occur due to changes in ion channels or inhibitory neurons not functioning properly. Forty-one ion-channel genes and over 1,600 ion-channel mutations have been implicated in the development of epileptic seizure. These ion channel mutations tend to confer a depolarized resting state to neurons resulting in pathological hyper-excitability. This long-lasting depolarization in individual neurons is due to an influx of Ca2+ from outside of the cell and leads to extended opening of Na+ channels and repetitive action potentials. The following hyperpolarization is facilitated by γ-aminobutyric acid (GABA) receptors or potassium (K+) channels, depending on the type of cell. Equally important in epileptic neuronal hyper-excitability, is the reduction in the activity of inhibitory GABAergic neurons, an effect known as disinhibition. Disinhibition may result from inhibitory neuron loss, dysregulation of axonal sprouting from the inhibitory neurons in regions of neuronal damage, or abnormal GABAergic signaling within the inhibitory neuron. Neuronal hyper-excitability results in a specific area from which seizures may develop, known as a "seizure focus". Following an injury to the brain, another mechanism of epilepsy may be the up regulation of excitatory circuits or down regulation of inhibitory circuits. These secondary epilepsies occur through processes known as epileptogenesis. Failure of the blood–brain barrier may also be a causal mechanism. While blood-brain barrier disruption alone does appear to cause epileptogenesis, it has been correlated to increased seizure activity. Furthermore, it has been implicated in chronic epileptic conditions through experiments inducing barrier permeability with chemical compounds. Disruption may lead to fluid leaking out of the blood vessels into the area between cells and driving epileptic seizures. Preliminary findings of blood proteins in the brain after a seizure support this theory.

Focal seizures begin in one hemisphere of the brain while generalized seizures begin in both hemispheres. Some types of seizures may change brain structure, while others appear to have little effect. Gliosis, neuronal loss, and atrophy of specific areas of the brain are linked to epilepsy but it is unclear if epilepsy causes these changes or if these changes result in epilepsy.

Seizure activity may be propagated through the brain's endogenous electrical fields. Proposed mechanisms that may cause the spread and recruitment of neurons include an increase in K+ from outside the cell, and increase of Ca2+ in the presynaptic terminals. These mechanisms blunt hyperpolarization and depolarizes nearby neurons, as well as increasing neurotransmitter release.

Diagnosis

Seizures may be divided into provoked and unprovoked. Provoked seizures may also be known as "acute symptomatic seizures" or "reactive seizures". Unprovoked seizures may also be known as "reflex seizures". Depending on the presumed cause blood tests and lumbar puncture may be useful. Hypoglycemia may cause seizures and should be ruled out. An electroencephalogram and brain imaging with CT scan or MRI scan is recommended in the work-up of seizures not associated with a fever.

Classification
Seizure types are organized by whether the source of the seizure is localized (focal seizures) or distributed (generalized seizures) within the brain. Generalized seizures are divided according to the effect on the body and include tonic-clonic (grand mal), absence (petit mal), myoclonic, clonic, tonic, and atonic seizures. Some seizures such as epileptic spasms are of an unknown type.

Focal seizures (previously called partial seizures) are divided into simple partial or complex partial seizure. Current practice no longer recommends this, and instead prefers to describe what occurs during a seizure.

The classification of seizures can also be made according to dynamical criteria, observable in electrophysiological measurements. It is a classification according to their type of onset and offset.

Physical examination

Most people are in a postictal state (drowsy or confused) following a seizure. They may show signs of other injuries. A bite mark on the side of the tongue helps confirm a seizure when present, but only a third of people who have had a seizure have such a bite. When present in people thought to have had a seizure, this physical sign tentatively increases the likelihood that a seizure was the cause.

Tests

An electroencephalography is only recommended in those who likely had an epileptic seizure and may help determine the type of seizure or syndrome present. In children it is typically only needed after a second seizure. It cannot be used to rule out the diagnosis and may be falsely positive in those without the disease. In certain situations it may be useful to prefer the EEG while sleeping or sleep deprived.

Diagnostic imaging by CT scan and MRI is recommended after a first non-febrile seizure to detect structural problems inside the brain. MRI is generally a better imaging test except when intracranial bleeding is suspected. Imaging may be done at a later point in time in those who return to their normal selves while in the emergency room. If a person has a previous diagnosis of epilepsy with previous imaging repeat imaging is not usually needed with subsequent seizures.

In adults, testing electrolytes, blood glucose and calcium levels is important to rule these out as causes, as is an electrocardiogram. A lumbar puncture may be useful to diagnose a central nervous system infection but is not routinely needed. Routine antiseizure medical levels in the blood are not required in adults or children. In children additional tests may be required.

A high blood prolactin level within the first 20 minutes following a seizure may be useful to confirm an epileptic seizure as opposed to psychogenic non-epileptic seizure. Serum prolactin level is less useful for detecting partial seizures. If it is normal an epileptic seizure is still possible and a serum prolactin does not separate epileptic seizures from syncope. It is not recommended as a routine part of diagnosis epilepsy.

Differential diagnosis
Differentiating an epileptic seizure from other conditions such as syncope can be difficult. Other possible conditions that can mimic a seizure include: decerebrate posturing, psychogenic seizures, tetanus, dystonia, migraine headaches, and strychnine poisoning. In addition, 5% of people with a positive tilt table test may have seizure-like activity that seems due to cerebral hypoxia. Convulsions may occur due to psychological reasons and this is known as a psychogenic non-epileptic seizure. Non-epileptic seizures may also occur due to a number of other reasons.

Prevention
A number of measures have been attempted to prevent seizures in those at risk. Following traumatic brain injury anticonvulsants decrease the risk of early seizures but not late seizures.

In those with a history of febrile seizures, some medications (both antipyretics and anticonvulsants) have been found effective for reducing reoccurrence, however due to the frequency of adverse effects and the benign nature of febrile seizures the decision to use medication should be weighted carefully against potential negative effects.

There is no clear evidence that antiepileptic drugs are effective or not effective at preventing seizures following a craniotomy, following subdural hematoma, after a stroke, or after subarachnoid haemorrhage, for both people who have had a previous seizure, and those who have not.

Management
Potentially sharp or dangerous objects should be moved from the area around a person experiencing a seizure so that the individual is not hurt. After the seizure, if the person is not fully conscious and alert, they should be placed in the recovery position. A seizure longer than five minutes, or two or more seizures occurring within the time of five minutes is a medical emergency known as status epilepticus. Contrary to a common misconception, bystanders should not attempt to force objects into the mouth of the person having a seizure, as doing so may cause injury to the teeth and gums.

Treatments of a person that is actively seizing follows a progression from initial response, through first line, second line, and third line treatments. The initial response involves ensuring the person is protected from potential harms (such as nearby objects) and managing their airway, breathing, and circulation. Airway management should include placing the person on their side, known as the recovery position, to prevent them from choking. If they are unable to breathe because something is blocking their airway, they may require treatments to open their airway.

Medication
The first line medication for an actively seizing person is a benzodiazepine, with most guidelines recommending lorazepam. Diazepam and midazolam are alternatives. This may be repeated if there is no effect after 10 minutes. If there is no effect after two doses, barbiturates or propofol may be used.

Second-line therapy for adults is phenytoin or fosphenytoin and phenobarbital for children. Third-line medications include phenytoin for children and phenobarbital for adults.

Ongoing anti-epileptic medications are not typically recommended after a first seizure except in those with structural lesions in the brain. They are generally recommended after a second one has occurred. Approximately 70% of people can obtain full control with continuous use of medication. Typically one type of anticonvulsant is preferred. Following a first seizure, while immediate treatment with an anti-seizure drug lowers the probability of seizure recurrence up to five years it does not change the risk of death and there are potential side effects.

In seizures related to toxins, up to two doses of benzodiazepines should be used. If this is not effective pyridoxine is recommended. Phenytoin should generally not be used.

There is a lack of evidence for preventive anti-epileptic medications in the management of seizures related to intracranial venous thrombosis.

Other
Helmets may be used to provide protection to the head during a seizure. Some claim that seizure response dogs, a form of service dog, can predict seizures. Evidence for this, however, is poor. At present there is not enough evidence to support the use of cannabis for the management of seizures, although this is an ongoing area of research. There is low quality evidence that a ketogenic diet may help in those who have epilepsy and is reasonable in those who do not improve following typical treatments.

Prognosis
Following a first seizure, the risk of more seizures in the next two years is 40–50%. The greatest predictors of more seizures are problems either on the electroencephalogram or on imaging of the brain. In adults, after 6 months of being seizure-free after a first seizure, the risk of a subsequent seizure in the next year is less than 20% regardless of treatment. Up to 7% of seizures that present to the emergency department (ER) are in status epilepticus. In those with a status epilepticus, mortality is between 10% and 40%. Those who have a seizure that is provoked (occurring close in time to an acute brain event or toxic exposure) have a low risk of re-occurrence, but have a higher risk of death compared to those with epilepsy.

Epidemiology
Approximately 8–10% of people will experience an epileptic seizure during their lifetime. In adults, the risk of seizure recurrence within the five years following a new-onset seizure is 35%; the risk rises to 75% in persons who have had a second seizure. In children, the risk of seizure recurrence within the five years following a single unprovoked seizure is about 50%; the risk rises to about 80% after two unprovoked seizures. In the United States in 2011, seizures resulted in an estimated 1.6 million emergency department visits; approximately 400,000 of these visits were for new-onset seizures. The exact incidence of epileptic seizures in low-income and middle-income countries is unknown, however it probably exceeds that in high-income countries. This may be due to increased risks of traffic accidents, birth injuries, and malaria and other parasitic infections.

History
Epileptic seizures were first described in an Akkadian text from 2000 B.C. Early reports of epilepsy often saw seizures and convulsions as the work of "evil spirits". The perception of epilepsy, however, began to change in the time of Ancient Greek medicine. The term "epilepsy" itself is a Greek word, which is derived from the verb "epilambanein", meaning "to seize, possess, or afflict". Although the Ancient Greeks referred to epilepsy as the "sacred disease", this perception of epilepsy as a "spiritual" disease was challenged by Hippocrates in his work On the Sacred Disease, who proposed that the source of epilepsy was from natural causes rather than supernatural ones.

Early surgical treatment of epilepsy was primitive in Ancient Greek, Roman and Egyptian medicine. The 19th century saw the rise of targeted surgery for the treatment of epileptic seizures, beginning in 1886 with localized resections performed by Sir Victor Horsley, a neurosurgeon in London. Another advancement was that of the development by the Montreal procedure by Canadian neurosurgeon Wilder Penfield, which involved use of electrical stimulation among conscious patients to more accurately identify and resect the epileptic areas in the brain.

Society and culture

Economics

Seizures result in direct economic costs of about one billion dollars in the United States. Epilepsy results in economic costs in Europe of around €15.5 billion in 2004. In India, epilepsy is estimated to result in costs of US$1.7 billion or 0.5% of the GDP. They make up about 1% of emergency department visits (2% for emergency departments for children) in the United States.

Driving
Many areas of the world require a minimum of six months from the last seizure before people can drive a vehicle.

Research
Scientific work into the prediction of epileptic seizures began in the 1970s. Several techniques and methods have been proposed, but evidence regarding their usefulness is still lacking.

Two promising areas include gene therapy, and seizure detection and seizure prediction.

Gene therapy for epilepsy consists of employing vectors to deliver pieces of genetic material to areas of the brain involved in seizure onset.

Seizure prediction is a special case of seizure detection in which the developed systems is able to issue a warning before the clinical onset of the epileptic seizure.

Computational neuroscience has been able to bring a new point of view on the seizures by considering the dynamical aspects.

References

External links 

 

Symptoms and signs
Wikipedia medicine articles ready to translate